Nova Zembla may refer to:

 Nova Zembla Island, Nunavut, Canada
 Novaya Zemlya, also known as Nova Zembla, a Russian archipelago in the Arctic Ocean
 Nova Zembla (film), a 2011 Dutch film
 Nova Zembla (record label), a Belgian electronic music label